The Blériot-SPAD S.41 was a French fighter aircraft developed in the early 1920s.

Design and development
The S.41 was a refinement of the S.XX and was a single-seat fighter biplane which had a monocoque fuselage made of wood. The wings, on the other hand, were made of wood and metal. In 1924, the S.41 was converted to a racer and redesignated S.41bis.

Specifications

See also

References

Bibliography

Fighter aircraft
Biplanes
1920s French fighter aircraft
S.41
Single-engined tractor aircraft
Aircraft first flown in 1922